Malvin Daniel Wald (August 8, 1917 – March 6, 2008) was an American screenwriter most famous for writing the 1948 police drama The Naked City, for which he was nominated for the Academy Award for Best Story. He wrote over 150 scripts for motion pictures and TV shows including Peter Gunn, Daktari, and Perry Mason. He also served with the Army Air Forces and taught screenwriting at the University of Southern California. He died at Sherman Oaks Hospital in Los Angeles from age-related causes at age 90.

Filmography

Films

Television

References

External links

'Naked City' writer Malvin Wald dies

1917 births
2008 deaths
American male screenwriters
First Motion Picture Unit personnel
20th-century American male writers
20th-century American screenwriters